The General debate of the seventy-sixth session of the United Nations General Assembly (UNGA) opened on 21 September and ran until 27 September 2021. Leaders from a number of member states addressed the UNGA.

Organisation and subjects
The order of speakers is given first to member states, then observer states and supranational bodies. Any other observer entities will have a chance to speak at the end of the debate, if they so choose. Speakers will be put on the list in the order of their request, with special consideration for ministers and other government officials of similar or higher rank. According to the rules in place for the General Debate, the statements should be in one of the United Nations official languages (Arabic, Chinese, English, French, Russian or Spanish) and will be translated and interpreted by  United Nations translators and interpreters. Each speaker is requested to provide 20 advance copies of their statements to the conference officers to facilitate translation and to be presented at the podium. The theme for this year's debate was chosen by President Abdulla Shahid as: "“Building resilience through hope – to recover from COVID-19,
rebuild sustainably, respond to the needs of the planet, respect the rights of people and revitalize the United Nations".

Speaking schedule
Since 1955, Brazil and the United States are the first and second countries to speak. Other countries follow according to a speaking schedule issued by the Secretariat.

The list of speakers is provided by both the daily UN Journal, while changes in order are also reflected by the UNGA General Debate website.

21 September

Morning session
  - Secretary-General António Guterres (Report of the UN Secretary-General)
  - 76th Session of the United Nations General Assembly - President Abdulla Shahid (Opening statement)
  - President Jair Bolsonaro
  - President Joe Biden
  - President Ibrahim Mohamed Solih
  - President Iván Duque Márquez
  - Emir Tamim bin Hamad Al Thani
  - President Zuzana Čaputová
  - President Marcelo Rebelo de Sousa
  - President Sadyr Japarov
  - President Gitanas Nausėda
  - President Shavkat Mirziyoyev
  - President Félix Tshisekedi
  - President Ebrahim Raisi
  - President Sebastián Piñera
  - President Moon Jae-in
  - President Recep Tayyip Erdoğan
  - President Guy Parmelin
  - President Xi Jinping

Evening session
  - President Zoran Milanović
  - President Abdel Fattah el-Sisi
  - President Pedro Castillo
  - President Gurbanguly Berdimuhamedow
  - President Sauli Niinistö
  - President Rodrigo Duterte
  - President Paul Kagame
  - President Alberto Fernández
  - President Klaus Iohannis
  - President Surangel Whipps Jr.
  - President Carlos Alvarado Quesada
  - President Andrzej Duda
  - President Guillermo Lasso
  - President Egils Levits
  - President Rumen Radev
  - President Hakainde Hichilema
  - President Faustin-Archange Touadéra
  - President Mohamed Abdullahi Mohamed

22 September

Morning session
  - Chairman of the Presidency Željko Komšić
  - King Abdullah II
  - President Andry Rajoelina
  - President Nana Akufo-Addo
  - President Gotabaya Rajapaksa
  - King Salman bin Abdulaziz
  - President Alejandro Giammattei
  - President David Kabua
  - President Maia Sandu
  - President Luis Lacalle Pou
  - President Kersti Kaljulaid
  - President Chan Santokhi
  - President Julius Maada Bio

Evening session
  - President Nicolás Maduro
  - President Ukhnaagiin Khürelsükh
  - President Uhuru Kenyatta
  - President Juan Orlando Hernández
  - President Joko Widodo
  - President Volodymyr Zelenskyy
  - President Lazarus Chakwera
  - President Jorge Carlos Fonseca
  - President Nguyễn Xuân Phúc
  - President Faure Gnassingbé
  - President Luis Abinader
  - President Umaro Sissoco Embaló
  - President Ismaïl Omar Guelleh
  - President Kassym-Jomart Tokayev
  - Prime Minister Pedro Sánchez
  - Prime Minister Erna Solberg
  - Prime Minister Boris Johnson

23 September

Morning session
  - President Cyril Ramaphosa
  - President Irfaan Ali
  - President Mokgweetsi Masisi
  - President Miguel Díaz-Canel
  - President João Lourenço
  - President Roch Marc Christian Kaboré
  - President Laurentino Cortizo
  - President Milo Đukanović
  - President Hage Geingob
  - President Stevo Pendarovski
  - President Lionel Aingimea
  - President Emmerson Mnangagwa
  - Chairman of the Transitional Military Council Mahamat Déby
  - President Azali Assoumani
  - President Ali Bongo Ondimba
  - President Samia Suluhu Hassan
  - President George Weah
  - President Barham Salih

Evening session
  - President David Panuelo
  - President Évariste Ndayishimiye
  - President Luis Arce
  - President Nayib Bukele
  - President Emomali Rahmon
  - President Yoweri Museveni
  - President Ilham Aliyev
  - Chairman of the Presidential Council Mohamed al-Menfi
  - Prince Albert II
  - President Teodoro Obiang Nguema Mbasogo
  - President Taneti Maamau
  - President Wavel Ramkalawan
  - Prime Minister Moeketsi Majoro
  - Prime Minister Mario Draghi
  - Minister of Foreign Affairs Jakub Kulhánek
  - Minister of Foreign Affairs Alexander Schallenberg
  - Secretary of Foreign Affairs Marcelo Ebrard
  - Minister of Foreign Affairs and Trade Péter Szijjártó

24 September

Morning session
  - President Nicos Anastasiades
  - President Muhammadu Buhari
  - President Michel Aoun
  - President Macky Sall
  - President Frank-Walter Steinmeier
  - President Borut Pahor
  - President Mario Abdo Benítez
  - President Mahmoud Abbas
  - President of the European Council Charles Michel
  - Vice President Isatou Touray
  - Vice President Mariam Chabi Talata
  - Fourth Vice President Rebecca Nyandeng De Mabior
  - Prime Minister Nikol Pashinyan
  - Prime Minister Pravind Jugnauth
  - Prime Minister Stefan Löfven
  - Prime Minister Mia Mottley
  - Prime Minister Sheikh Hasina
  - Prime Minister Mark Rutte
  - Prime Minister Kyriakos Mitsotakis

Evening session
  - Prime Minister Yoshihide Suga
  - Prime Minister Robert Abela
  - Taoiseach Micheál Martin
  - Prime Minister Edi Rama
  - Prime Minister Jacinda Ardern
  - Prime Minister James Marape
  - Prime Minister Xavier Bettel
  - Prime Minister Imran Khan
  - Prime Minister Irakli Garibashvili
  - Prime Minister Scott Morrison
  - Prime Minister Sheikh Sabah Al-Khalid Al-Sabah
  - Prime Minister Ana Brnabić
  - Prime Minister Mette Frederiksen
  - Prime Minister Andrew Holness
  - Prime Minister John Briceño
  - Prime Minister Alexander De Croo
  - Prime Minister Timothy Harris

25 September

Morning session
  - Prime Minister Narendra Modi
  - Prime Minister Philip Joseph Pierre
  - Prime Minister Xavier Espot
  - Prime Minister Cleopas Dlamini
  - Prime Minister Ralph Gonsalves
  - Prime Minister Ariel Henry
  - Prime Minister Ismail Sabri Yaakob
  - Prime Minister Phankham Viphavanh
  - Prime Minister Abdalla Hamdok
  - Prime Minister Hun Sen
  - Prime Minister Frank Bainimarama
  - Prime Minister Lotay Tshering
  - Prime Minister Prayut Chan-o-cha
  - Prime Minister Bob Loughman
  - Prime Minister Philip Davis
  - Prime Minister Pohiva Tuʻiʻonetoa
  - Minister of Foreign Affairs Sergey Lavrov

Evening session
  - Prime Minister Fiamē Naomi Mataʻafa
  - Prime Minister Kausea Natano
  - Prime Minister Gaston Browne
  - Prime Minister Manasseh Sogavare
  - Prime Minister Choguel Kokalla Maïga
  - Secretary of State Pietro Parolin
  - Deputy Prime Minister Demeke Mekonnen
  - Minister of Foreign Affairs Dominique Hasler
  - Minister of Foreign Affairs Vivian Balakrishnan

27 September

Morning session
  - Prime Minister Naftali Bennett
  - Minister of Foreign Affairs Vladimir Makei
  - Minister of Foreign Affairs Ahmad Awad bin Mubarak
  - Minister of State for Foreign Affairs Khalifa Shaheen Al Marar
  - Minister of Foreign Affairs Faisal Mekdad
  - Minister of Foreign Affairs Guðlaugur Þór Þórðarson
  - Minister of Foreign Affairs Ramtane Lamamra
  - Minister of Foreign Affairs Oliver Joseph
  - Minister of Foreign Affairs Osman Saleh Mohammed
  - Minister of Foreign Affairs Abdullatif bin Rashid Al Zayani
  - Secretary of Foreign Affairs Luca Beccari
  - Minister of Foreign Affairs Sayyid Badr Albusaidi
  - Minister of Foreign Affairs Edite Tenjua
  - Minister of Foreign Affairs Kandia Camara
  - Second Minister of Foreign Affairs Erywan Yusof
  - Minister of Foreign Affairs Ismail Ould Cheikh Ahmed
  - Minister of Foreign Affairs Hassoumi Massaoudou
  - Minister for Europe and Foreign Affairs Jean-Yves Le Drian
  - Minister of Foreign Affairs Lejeune Mbella Mbella

Evening session
  - Minister of Foreign Affairs Jean-Claude Gakosso
  - Minister of Foreign Affairs Kenneth Darroux
  - Minister of Foreign Affairs Nasser Bourita
  - Minister of Foreign Affairs Verónica Macamo
  - Minister of Foreign Affairs Amery Browne
  - Minister of Foreign Affairs Othman Jerandi
  - Minister of Foreign Affairs Narayan Khadka
  - Minister of Foreign Affairs Denis Moncada
  - Minister of Foreign Affairs Marc Garneau
  - Minister of Foreign Affairs Mamadi Touré
  - Permanent Representative Kim Song
  - Permanent Representative Karlito Nunes

No representatives for Afghanistan and Myanmar were on the agenda of the general debate.

Notes

References

2021 in international relations
2021 in New York City
General debates of the United Nations General Assembly
September 2021 events in the United States